Tisch Mills is an unincorporated community in Kewaunee and Manitowoc counties, Wisconsin, United States.

History
The community is named after Charles Tisch.

Volunteer fire department

Tisch Mills is served by a volunteer fire department.

Religion
St. Isidore the Farmer Parish in the community is part of the Roman Catholic Diocese of Green Bay.

Notable people
Anton Holly, Wisconsin State Assemblyman and farmer, owned a meat market in Tisch Mills.
Anton G. Schauer, Wisconsin State Assemblyman, farmer, educator, and businessman, lived in Tisch Mills.

Images

References

Unincorporated communities in Kewaunee County, Wisconsin
Unincorporated communities in Manitowoc County, Wisconsin
Unincorporated communities in Wisconsin